Cicely Fisher ( Corbett; 1885–1959) was a British suffragist and workers' rights activist. She was one of the founders of the Liberal Women's Suffrage Group.

Biography
Cicely Corbett was born in 1885 in Danehill, East Sussex, to Charles Corbett, a Liberal Party politician and barrister, and Marie Corbett, a suffragist. Cicely and her older sister, Margery, were taught at home by their parents and another local woman. Both parents were outspoken supporters of women's rights, and at fifteen years old, Cicely formed a society with her sister and their friends called the Younger Suffragists. 

She began studying modern history at Somerville College, Oxford, in 1904 and there she became involved in the Oxford branch of the National Union of Women's Suffrage Societies. She and Margery left the Women's Liberal Federation due to their disappointment with the Liberal Party's commitment to women's suffrage and, with their mother, they established the Liberal Women's Suffrage Group.

After leaving university, Corbett began working for Clementina Black's organisation, the Women's Industrial Council, which campaigned for improvements in wages and conditions for working women. She also organised conferences on behalf of the National Anti-Sweating League to demand better working conditions in certain trades. She often organised speeches by exploited women workers and spoke out against child labour.

Corbett married Chalmers Fisher, a liberal journalist, in 1913, and they both adopted the surname Corbett Fisher. They had a daughter, Bridget Gilling, in 1922, and frequently housed students and refugees in their Sussex home. In her later life, Corbett Fisher was an active member of the Labour Party and the Women's International League for Peace and Freedom before her death in 1959.

Between 1937 and 1939 Corbett owned MG K3004 which was driven on her behalf by H. Stuart-Wilton at Brooklands, Crystal Palace and Brighton Speed Trials.

References

1885 births
1959 deaths
British feminists
British women activists
British suffragists
British women's rights activists
Workers' rights activists
Alumni of Somerville College, Oxford
People from Danehill, East Sussex